Herman Emanuel Bemberg Ocampo (29 March 1859 – 21 July 1931) was a German-Argentine composer.

Life
He was born in Paris (or most probably in Buenos Aires) of German Argentine parents (Otto Bemberg 1827–95 and Luisa Bernabela Ocampo Regueira 1831–1904) and studied at the Paris Conservatoire, under Massenet, whose influence, with that of Gounod, is strongly marked in his music. He won the Rossini Prize in 1885. As a composer, he was known by numerous songs and pieces for the piano, as well as by his cantata La Mort de Jeanne d'Arc (1886), the comic opera Le Baiser de Suzon (1888), and the grand opera Elaine (produced at Covent Garden and starring the great Australian soprano Nellie Melba in 1892). 

Among Bemberg's songs the dramatic recitative Ballade du Desespere was well known, and Chant Hindou was quite popular and frequently included in anthologies. 
He died in Bern, Switzerland.

References 

Attribution

External links
 
 

1859 births
1931 deaths
French classical composers
French male classical composers
Musicians from Buenos Aires
Musicians from Paris
Conservatoire de Paris alumni
Argentine people of German descent
French people of German descent
French people of Argentine descent
19th-century classical composers
20th-century classical composers
20th-century French composers
19th-century French composers
20th-century French male musicians
19th-century French male musicians